White Hall may refer to:

Geography

United States
White Hall, Alabama
White Hall, Arkansas
White Hall, California
White Hall Township, Greene County, Illinois
White Hall, Illinois
White Hall, Baltimore County, Maryland
White Hall, Cecil County, Maryland
White Hall, Prince George's County, Maryland
White Hall, Albemarle County, Virginia
White Hall, Frederick County, Virginia
White Hall, West Virginia

Elsewhere
White Hall, Northern Ireland, a townland in County Antrim
White Hall, Saint Elizabeth, Jamaica, a settlement

Buildings

United States
 White Hall (Bear, Delaware), NRHP-listed
 White Hall (Daytona Beach, Florida), NRHP-listed
 White Hall (West Point, Georgia), listed on the NRHP in Harris County, Georgia
 White Hall (Whitehall, Georgia), listed on the NRHP in Clarke County, Georgia
 White Hall (Richmond, Kentucky), NRHP-listed
 White Hall Plantation House, NRHP-listed in Pointe Coupee Parish, Louisiana
 White Hall (Ellicott City, Maryland), NRHP-listed in Howard County
 White Hall (Princess Anne, Maryland), NRHP-listed in Somerset County
 White Hall (Cornell University, Ithaca, New York)
 White Hall (Spring Hill, Tennessee), listed on the NRHP in Maury County, Tennessee
 White Hall (Toano, Virginia), NRHP-listed in James City County
 White Hall (Zanoni, Virginia), NRHP-listed in Gloucester County

Elsewhere
White Hall, one of the Magnificent Seven Houses in Trinidad and Tobago, is the house of the Prime Minister of the Republic of Trinidad and Tobago.

See also
White's Hall 
Whitehall (disambiguation)